Frank Thomas Purdon (8 November 1857 – ?) was an Irish-born rugby union forward who played club rugby for Newport and Swansea. Purdon was capped four times for Wales including the first Wales international, against England in 1881.

Rugby career
Purdon was selected, while a Newport player, for Richard Mullock's Wales to face England in the first Welsh international at Blackheath on 19 February 1881. Wales were humiliated, and the national press blamed the team selection, with the players apparently chosen to appease the principal rugby clubs rather than selected on the basis of ability. Many of the Welsh players from that game never played for Wales again, but Purdon was back for Wales second international game, played in 1882 against Ireland in Dublin.

Purdon played his last two matches for Wales after transferring to Swansea, and was a member of the Welsh squad that took part in the first Home Nations Championship under the captaincy of Charles Lewis. Wales lost both games and Purdon was not re-selected for the 1884 tournament.

International matches played
Wales
  1881, 1882
  1882
  1883

Bibliography

References

1857 births
Newport RFC players
Rugby union forwards
Rugby union players from County Westmeath
Swansea RFC players
Wales international rugby union players
Welsh rugby union players
Year of death missing